Without U may refer to:

 "Without U" (2PM song)
 "Without U", song by Thelma Aoyama
 "Without U", song by Jesse McCartney from his 2004 album Beautiful Soul

See also 
 Without You (disambiguation)